Olinto Mark Barsanti (November 11, 1917 – May 2, 1973) was commander of the 101st Airborne Division in Vietnam from 1967 to 1968, commanding during the Tet Offensive and during subsequent operations around Bien Hoa and Huế. He commanded the 3rd Battalion, 38th Infantry Regiment, 2nd Infantry Division during World War II (in Normandy, Brittany, and Belgium). He served in the Korean War from the beginning of the conflict in July 1950 until August 1951. During his tour in Korea his assignments included staff officer with X Corps and commander of the 9th Infantry Regiment, 2nd Infantry Division. He is one of the most highly decorated American soldiers in history, receiving approximately 60 decorations, including the DSC, DSM, 5 Silver Stars, 2 Legions of Merit, 8 Bronze Stars, 7 Air Medals, 7 Purple Hearts, and the French Croix de guerre (WWII) with bronze palm.

Barsanti died of cancer in 1973. He is buried at Arlington National Cemetery.

World War II 

In 1944, Barsanti arrived on the coast of France, the day after D-Day, as commander of the 3rd Battalion, 38th Infantry Regiment. At 26 years old, he was one of the youngest battalion commanders in the Army. During his eight months serving in the war, Barsanti was awarded five Purple Hearts and four Bronze Star Medals. Barsanti personally assisted each of his regiments during a successful defense against a German counter-attack, and helped take a German stronghold. These two acts earned him two Silver Star Medals.

Korean War 

In June 1950, two days after North Korea invaded South Korea, Barsanti and a few other officers arrived to establish a command post for General of the Army Douglas MacArthur in Suwon, South Korea. His efforts in setting up facilities, transportation, and necessary systems, unassisted except for indigenous personnel, earned him a Legion of Merit. He went on to command the 9th Infantry Regiment during the Korean War, and was the youngest Regimental Commander in Korea at the age of 33. His successful completion of a lone mission to deliver secret orders to two South Korean infantry divisions 190 miles behind enemy lines earned him a Distinguished Service Cross.

Vietnam War 

In 1967, Barsanti was assigned command of the 101st Airborne Division which was stationed at Fort Campbell, Kentucky. His orders were to prepare the Division for combat in Vietnam. In August 1967, Barsanti received orders to prepare for Operation Eagle Thrust, the largest air-flight transfer of men and equipment from the U.S. to Southeast Asia. Barsanti arrived in Vietnam on December 13, 1967, to report for duty. During Barsanti's seven months commanding the 101st Airborne in Vietnam, the unit had over 8,000 enemy kills, more than 350 detainees taken, and more than 2,650 weapons captured.

Chronological List of Assignments

Awards and decorations

Honors 

In his memory, the University of North Texas established the Barsanti Military History Center. The current director of the Barsanti program is Geoffrey Wawro.

Fort Campbell held a dedication ceremony for the Olinto M. Barsanti Elementary School, a Department of the Defense Education Activity school.  The new school is located in the southern portion of the Fort Campbell Army Post. The 93,000 square-foot, $18 million building was built to accommodate the growing availability of on-post-housing, and serves the Gardner Hills and The Woodlands housing areas. It opened its doors to approximately 550 Pre-K through 5th grade students on January 3, 2011.

References

External links
 Olinro M. Barsanti at ArlingtonCemetery.net, an unofficial website 
 Barsanti Papers at UNT Special Collections Finding Aid
 Digitized Barsanti Papers from UNT Special Collections

☆

1917 births
1973 deaths
Recipients of the Distinguished Service Medal (US Army)
Recipients of the Silver Star
Recipients of the Distinguished Service Cross (United States)
Recipients of the Legion of Merit
Recipients of the Air Medal
United States Army personnel of the Vietnam War
United States Army Command and General Staff College faculty
United States Army generals
Burials at Arlington National Cemetery
United States Army personnel of World War II
United States Army personnel of the Korean War
Deaths from cancer in the United States
Military personnel from Nevada
Recipients of the Croix de Guerre 1939–1945 (France)
Recipients of the National Order of Vietnam